The siege of Küstrin (Cüstrin) in 1758 was a siege of the Seven Years' War (1756-1763). It was conducted by the Russians against the fortified town of Küstrin in Prussia (now in Poland).

Aftermath 
The Russian besiegers probably did not intend for the town to experience such destruction. Nevertheless, when the Prussian army saw how the Russian bombardment devastated the city it became a major cause for Prussian animosity towards the Russian army. However, this devastation was not necessarily unique to Küstrin. The sieges against Zittau (1757) and Dresden (1760) also were particularly destructive in an era generally characterized by restraint.

References 

Duffy, Christopher. The Military Experience in the Age of Reason. Atheneum, 1988 pp. 7, 9, 293.

Battles of the Seven Years' War
Kostrzyn nad Odrą
Sieges involving Prussia
Küstrin
Battles of the Silesian Wars